Chak Ali Shah is a village approximately  east of tehsil Pind Dadan Khan, Jhelum District, in the province of Punjab, Pakistan.

It is bounded in the south by the River Jhelum and on the north by the Salt Range. Neighbouring villages are Chak Hamid and Nawan Loke, and the nearest large town is Dharyala Jalap.

The majority of the population is Muslim Jalap Rajputs, but there are also well-known Jat  and Syed families.  Notable families in the village are Hayats and Sardars.

Populated places in Jhelum District